The 1985 Women's Seven-Up World Team Squash Championships were held in Dublin, Ireland and took place from September 2 until September 7, 1985.

Results

First round

Pool 1

Pool 2

Pool 3

Pool 4

Second round

Group A

Group B

Semi finals

Third Place Play Off

Final

See also 
World Team Squash Championships
World Squash Federation
World Open (squash)

References 

World Squash Championships
Squash
Squash tournaments in Ireland
International sports competitions hosted by Ireland
Wom
Squash
1985 in women's squash